Bellinzago may refer to:

Bellinzago Lombardo, a municipality in the Province of Milan
Bellinzago Novarese, a municipality in the Province of Novara in the Italian Piedmont region
F.C.D. Sporting Bellinzago